Memories in March is a 2010 Indian drama film directed by Sanjoy Nag. The film stars Deepti Naval, Rituparno Ghosh and  Raima Sen. The film is the effective exploration of a situation wherein a bereaved mother comes to terms with her late son's sexual identity. The film was released on 1 Apr 2011.

Plot
Delhi-based Arati Mishra believed her worst day was when she was divorced from her U.S.-based husband, Suresh, until she got the news that her Kolkata-based son, Siddhartha, had been killed in a traffic accident. She travels to Kolkata; is received at the airport by her son's co-worker, Sahana Choudhury, and accompanies her to the crematorium. After the cremation, she is then taken to the guest-house where her son used to live, and told that Siddhartha had been at a party, had not only consumed considerable alcohol but had also insisted on driving, and met with a fatal accident. The next day, she accompanies Sahana to her son's place of employment where she meets some of the staff and signs some documents, but ends up distressed when she is not permitted to take her son's belongings. Quite upset, blaming the office workers' for letting her son drive under the influence, she does not realize that she will be in for more shocks and surprises when she will find that her son had a secret life. Later she accuses Ornub of seducing her son into this but realizes her son's love for him.

Cast

Awards

58th National Film Awards
 Best Feature Film in English
 Deepti Naval was Winner of Best Actress Award at the 2012 ImagineIndia Film Festival (in Spain),

References

External links

 

2010 films
2010 drama films
Indian drama films
Films set in Kolkata
Indian LGBT-related films
English-language Indian films
Best English Feature Film National Film Award winners
LGBT-related drama films
2010 LGBT-related films
Films directed by Sanjoy Nag